Julio Brian Gutiérrez González (born September 14, 1979) is a retired Chilean football player. He also spent much time playing in Italy from 2000 to 2005.

In 2006, Gutiérrez returned to his first club in Chile, Unión Española. His ability led to signing with Universidad Católica and being called up to the national team.

Club career
Gutiérrez began his career with Unión Española, who sold his contract to Italian side Udinese in 2001. He was unable to find many opportunities with the Udinese first team, and went on loan to Messina. Gutiérrez returned to Udinese for a year but was again unable to break into the first team. He went out on loan again, to Pescara, then to Sambenedettese, and finally to Grosseto.

Following his spell in Italy, Gutiérrez joined Indios of the Mexican Primera División A. Next, Gutiérrez returned to Chile to play for the club where he began his career, Unión Española, where he enjoyed two good seasons. Following that success, he transferred to Universidad Católica.

International career
Following his good performances in Unión Española, Gutiérrez was selected for Chile U20 for the 1999 South American Championship. He played with the squad in the pre-Olympic Tournament 2000 in Londrina, Brazil, where he helped Chile qualify for the Olympic Games in Sydney in the same year.

At senior level, he made 5 appearances for the national team. In addition, he made an appearance for Chile B in the friendly match against Catalonia on 28 December 2001.

Honours

Player
Udinese
 Intertoto Cup (1): 2000

References

External links

1979 births
Living people
Footballers from Santiago
Association football forwards
Chilean footballers
Chilean expatriate footballers
Chile international footballers
Chile under-20 international footballers
Chilean Primera División players
Unión Española footballers
Club Deportivo Universidad Católica footballers
Serie A players
Serie B players
Udinese Calcio players
A.C.R. Messina players
Delfino Pescara 1936 players
A.S. Sambenedettese players
F.C. Grosseto S.S.D. players
Ascenso MX players
Indios de Ciudad Juárez footballers
Categoría Primera A players
Independiente Santa Fe footballers
Venezuelan Primera División players
Deportivo Táchira F.C. players
A.C.C.D. Mineros de Guayana players
Expatriate footballers in Italy
Expatriate footballers in Mexico
Expatriate footballers in Colombia
Expatriate footballers in Venezuela
Chilean expatriate sportspeople in Italy
Chilean expatriate sportspeople in Mexico
Chilean expatriate sportspeople in Colombia
Chilean expatriate sportspeople in Venezuela